Kishangarh State was a princely state of India from 1611 to 1948. It was founded by the Jodhpur prince Kishan Singh in 1609. Before Kishan Singh this area was ruled by Raja Samokhan Singh.

Kishangarh State was located between 25° 49′ and 26° 59′ in the north, and 70° 49′ and 75° 11′ east. Bordered on the North and northwest by Jodhpur; on the east by Jaipur; on the west and southeast by the Ajmer District and on the extreme south by Shahpura.

History
Kishen Singh, who was the son of Udai Singh of Jodhpur left his family's lands for Ajmer in 1596. From the Mughal Emperor Akbar he received the district of Hindaun (now in Jaipur); and later, the grant of Setholao along with certain other districts. In 1611, he founded the town of Kishangarh which name was then also given to the state. The 13th Chief succeeding Udai Singh was Kalyan Singh (1797-1832) and in his time, on 26 March 1818, Kishangarh was brought under British Protection.

.
             
Kishangarh was the capital of the princely state during the British Raj, which was located in the Rajputana Agency. It had an area of 2210 km2 (858 miles²) and a population in 1901 of 90,970. This figure for population represented a decrease of 27% over the census figure of 1891, something presumably attributable to the famine of 1899–1900. Population was 85,744 in 1931. The state enjoyed an estimated revenue of £.30,000/- in 1875 and paid no tribute to the British Raj. In 1840, Prithvi Singh, became the 15th Maharaja of Kishangarh, and reigned till his death in 1879, after which he was succeeded by his son, Sardul Singh.

Maharaja Madan Singh ascended the throne in 1900 at the age of sixteen, at a time when the state was reeling from the impact of a devastating drought. The administration under him and his diwan was widely deemed worthy of approbation; irrigation from tanks and wells was extended and factories for ginning and pressing cotton were started. A social reform movement for discouraging excessive expenditure on marriages made remarkable impact during his reign.

Rulers
The rulers of Kishangarh who belonged to the Rathor dynasty took the title of 'Maharaja'.
1611 – 1615: Kishan Singh
1615 – 1618: Sahas Mal
1617 – 1629: Jag Mal
1629 – 1643: Hari Singh
1643 – 1658: Rup Singh
Jun 1658 – Oct 1706: Man Singh (b. 1655 – d. 1706) 
Oct 1706 – Apr 1748: Raj Singh (b. 1674 – d. 1748) 
1748 – 1781: Bahadur Singh (d. 1781) 
1748 – 21 Aug 1765: Samant Singh (b. 1699 – d. 1765) (in opposition to 1756; from 1756 raja of Roopnagar)
21 Aug 1765 – 16 May 1768: Sardar Singh (b. 1730 – d. 1768) (Raja of Roopnagar; regent for Samant 1756–65)
1781 – 22 Nov 1788: Birad Singh (b. 1737 – d. 1788) 
22 Nov 1788 – 5 Mar 1798: Pratap Singh (b. 1763 – d. 1798) 
 5 Mar 1798 – 22 May 1839: Kalyan Singh (b. 1794 – d. 1839) 
22 May 1839 – 31 Aug 1841: Mohkam Singh (b. 1817 – d. 1841) 
31 Aug 1841 – 25 Dec 1879: Prithvi Singh (b. 1838 – d. 1879) 
25 Dec 1879 – 18 Aug 1900: Sardul Singh (b. 1857 – d. 1900) (from 1 Jan 1892, Sir Sardul Singh)
18 Aug 1900 – 25 Sep 1926: Madan Singh (b. 1884 – d. 1926) (from 1 Jan 1909, Sir Madan Singh)
25 Sep 1926 – 3 Feb 1939: Yagya Narayan Singh (b. 1896 – d. 1939) 
 3 Feb 1939 – 15 Aug 1947: Sumar Singh (b. 1929 – d. 1971)

Titular Maharaja
 1947 – 1971 Sumar Singh

See also
Naubat Khan

References

External links

Kishangarh Exhibit of the state's stamps by Ajay Mittal
Kishangarh Revenues Exhibit of the state's stamps by Abdul Mollah
Kishangarh as Exhibited by Ajay Mittal

Ajmer district
Princely states of India
Rajputs
Rajputana Agency
1611 establishments in India
Rathores
1947 disestablishments in India
Kishangarh